Young Communist League of Sweden (Sveriges Kommunistiska Ungdomsförbund) is the youth wing of the Communist Party of Sweden (SKP). It was founded in 2000. The organization is a member of the World Federation of Democratic Youth.

External links
 SKU website

Youth wings of communist parties
Youth wings of political parties in Sweden
Organizations established in 2000
2000 establishments in Sweden